Lil' Ronnie (born Ronnie Jackson) is an American record producer from Kansas City, Missouri and Atlanta, Georgia, who has produced tracks for artists R. Kelly, T.I., Bow Wow, Britney Spears T-Pain, Usher, Mary J. Blige, Ciara, Reuben Studdard and many more.

In 2009, he released the single "Addicted" featuring Lil' Bow Wow. He was a producer on R. Kelly's album Untitled, released on October 13, 2009.

Production credits
Scotty McCreery – "I Love You This Big"
Lupe Fiasco – "Out of My Head"; off the album Lasers
Musiq Soulchild – "Back to Where", "Good Girl"; off the album MusiqInTheMagiq
Bow Wow – "I'm a Flirt" feat. R. Kelly; off the album The Price of Fame
Reuben Studdard – "Sorry 2004"; off the album Soulful
R. Kelly – "I'm a Flirt" remix feat T.I and T-Pain; off the album Double Up
R. Kelly – "Same Girl" feat Usher; off the album Double Up
R. Kelly – "Hook it Up" feat Huey; off the album Double Up
R. Kelly – "Crazy Night" feat Rock City; off the album Untitled
Britney Spears – "Lace and Leather"; off the album Circus
Plies – "Please Excuse My Hands" (feat. Jamie Foxx & The-Dream); off the album Definition of Real
Ciara – "Tell Me What Your Name Is"; off the album Fantasy Ride
Priscilla Renea – "Dollhouse"
Raheem DeVaughn – "Microphone", "Black & Blue", "XOXO"; off the album The Love & War MasterPeace
Jessica Mauboy – "Foreign"; off the album Get 'Em Girls
Jessica Mauboy – "No One like You"; off the album Get 'Em Girls
2 Chainz – "In Town" feat. Mike Posner; off the album Based on a T.R.U. Story
 Isaac Carree – "Clean This House"; off the album "Reset"
 But God ft James Fortune, Paradise, Famous, Preach, So Glad ft Kirk Franklin, kierra Sheard, Lecrae, Lifestyle, Never, Blessing in your lesson Ft Le'Andria Johnson
J. Holiday – "After We Fuck"; off the album Guilty ConscienceIncredible, Thinking about you, Guilty Conscience, Ms Get around, Wrong Turn, Home Wrecker, Dumb, Come back home, Where are you Now, Heaven
Tyrese – "One Night", "It's All on Me"; off the album Open Invitation
 K. Michelle – "Love 'Em All", "Cry", "How Do You Know", "Build A Man", "God I Get It"; off the album  Anybody Want To Buy A Heart
 Ne-Yo - Non-Fiction album Come over
 Lecrae – "Protect My Peace" featuring Jordan L'Oreal; off the mixtape Church Clothes 4

References

Living people
Hip hop record producers
Year of birth missing (living people)